The 2020 Portland State Vikings football team represented Portland State University during the 2020–21 NCAA Division I FCS football season. They were led by sixth-year head coach Bruce Barnum and were scheduled to play their home games at Hillsboro Stadium, though they did not play a home game. They were a member of the Big Sky Conference.

Previous season

The Vikings finished the 2019 season 5–7, 3–5 in Big Sky play to finish in a three-way tie for sixth place.

Preseason

Polls
On July 23, 2020, during the virtual Big Sky Kickoff, the Vikings were predicted to finish eighth in the Big Sky by the coaches and seventh by the media.

Schedule
Portland State had games scheduled against Arizona and Oregon State, which were later canceled before the start of the 2020 season.

The Vikings' April 17 game against Montana was counted as a non-conference game, even though both schools compete in the Big Sky Conference.

References

Portland State
Portland State Vikings football seasons
Portland State Vikings football
Portland State Vikings football
College football winless seasons